Adelpha lycorias, the pink-banded sister, is a species of butterfly of the family Nymphalidae.

Description
The uppersides of the wings are generally deep brown, with black apex of the anterior wings. The anterior wings are crossed by a broad band of pink or crimson, irregular in its outer margin, commencing on the middle of the costa and ending at the outer margin. The undersides are chocolate colour, while the nervure, the lines between them and the submarginal line are black. The band of the anterior wings is almost white, slightly tinged with crimson.

Larvae feed on Trema micrantha and on Urera, Myriocarpa and Cecropia species.

Distribution
This species can be found in Mexico, Brazil, Venezuela, Peru, Bolivia, Colombia, Ecuador and Guatemala, usually between 500 and 1800 meters.

Subspecies
A. l. lycorias (Brazil) 
A. l. lara (Hewitson, 1850) (Venezuela, Peru, Bolivia, Colombia, Ecuador)
A. l. wallisii (Dewitz, 1877) (Colombia)
A. l. melanthe (Bates, 1864) (Mexico, Guatemala - Venezuela)
A. l. melanippe Godman & Salvin, 1884 (Colombia)

References
"Adelpha Hübner, [1819]" at Markku Savela's Lepidoptera and Some Other Life Forms

External links
 Adelpha lycorias
 Butterflies of America

Adelpha
Fauna of Brazil
Nymphalidae of South America
Butterflies described in 1824
Taxa named by Jean-Baptiste Godart